The 2021 Indy Eleven season is the club's eighth season of existence, their eighth consecutive season in the second tier of American soccer, and their fourth season in the league now named the USL Championship. This article covers the period from November 2, 2020 (the day after the ultimately cancelled 2020 USL-C playoffs final) to the end of the 2021 USL-C season (tentatively scheduled for November, 2021).

Roster

Competitions

USL Championship

Standings

Match results

USL Cup Playoffs

U.S. Open Cup

On March 29, 2021, the U.S. Soccer Federation announced a truncated format for the 2021 U.S. Open Cup, with 16 clubs participating, entering at the same time in a Round of 16. The format included just four teams from the USL Championship, the four semi-finalists from the 2020 playoffs (El Paso, Louisville, Phoenix, and Tampa). Due to the fact that Indy failed to qualify for the 2020 USL-C playoffs, the club was eliminated from the 2021 U.S. Open Cup.

See also
 Indy Eleven
 2021 in American soccer
 2021 USL Championship season

References

Indy Eleven seasons
Indy Eleven
Indy Eleven
Indy Eleven